The Ukhta (- Ukva) is a river in the Komi Republic of Russia. It is a left tributary of the Izhma (in the Pechora's drainage basin).

The river freezes over in October or November and remains icebound until April.

The Ukhta has its sources in the Timan Ridge. It flows first to the south and later turns east. It flows through the city of Ukhta and joins the Izhma at the town of Sosnogorsk. The river is fast, with many rapids.

References

Rivers of the Komi Republic